Alaric II ("ruler of all"; ;  – August 507) was the King of the Visigoths from 484 until 507. He succeeded his father Euric as king of the Visigoths in Toulouse on 28 December 484; he was the great-grandson of the more famous Alaric I, who sacked Rome in 410. He established his capital at Aire-sur-l'Adour (Vicus Julii) in Aquitaine. His dominions included not only the majority of Hispania (excluding its northwestern corner) but also Gallia Aquitania and the greater part of an as-yet undivided Gallia Narbonensis.

Reign
Herwig Wolfram opens his chapter on the eighth Visigothic king, "Alaric's reign gets no full treatment in the sources, and the little they do contain is overshadowed by his death in the Battle of Vouillé and the downfall of the Toulosan kingdom." One example is Isidore of Seville's account of Alaric's reign: consisting of a single paragraph, it is primarily about Alaric's death in that battle.

The earliest-documented event in Alaric's reign concerned providing refuge to Syagrius, the former ruler of the Domain of Soissons (in what is now northwestern France) who had been defeated by Clovis I, King of the Franks. According to Gregory of Tours' account, Alaric was intimidated by Clovis into surrendering Syagrius to Clovis; Gregory then adds that "the Goths are a timorous race." The Franks then imprisoned Syagrius, and once his control over Syagrius' former kingdom was secure, Clovis had him beheaded. However, Wolfram points out that at the time "Clovis got no farther than the Seine; only after several more years did the Franks succeed in occupying the rest of the Gallo-Roman buffer state north of the Loire." Any threat of war Clovis could make would only be effective if they were neighbors; "it is nowhere written that Syagrius was handed over in 486 or 487."

Despite Frankish advances in the years that followed, Alaric was not afraid to take the military initiative when it presented itself. In 490, Alaric assisted his fellow Gothic king, Theodoric the Great, in his conquest of Italy by dispatching an army to raise Odoacer's siege of Pavia, where Theodoric had been trapped. Then when the Franks attacked the Burgundians in the decade after 500, Alaric assisted the ruling house, and according to Wolfram the victorious Burgundian king Gundobad ceded Avignon to Alaric. By 502 Clovis and Alaric met on an island in the Loire near Amboise for face-to-face talks, which led to a peace treaty.

In 506, the Visigoths captured the city of Dertosa in the Ebro valley. There they captured the Roman usurper Peter and had him executed.

Battle of Vouillé and aftermath

After a few years, however, Clovis violated the peace treaty negotiated in 502. Despite the diplomatic intervention of Theodoric, king of the Ostrogoths and father-in-law of Alaric, Clovis led his followers into Visigothic territory. Alaric was forced by his magnates to meet Clovis in the Battle of Vouillé (summer 507) near Poitiers; there the Goths were defeated and Alaric slain, according to Gregory of Tours, by Clovis himself.

The most serious consequence of this battle was not the loss of their possessions in Gaul to the Franks; with Ostrogothic help, much of the Gallic territory was recovered, Herwig Wolfram notes, perhaps as far as Toulouse. Nor was it the loss of the royal treasury at Toulouse, which Gregory of Tours writes Clovis took into his possession. As Peter Heather notes, the Visigothic kingdom was thrown into disarray "by the death of its king in battle." Alaric's heirs were his eldest son, the illegitimate Gesalec, and his younger son, the legitimate Amalaric who was still a child. Gesalec proved incompetent, and in 511 King Theodoric assumed the throne of the kingdom ostensibly on behalf of Amalaric—Heather uses the word "hijacked" to describe his action. Although Amalaric eventually became king in his own right, the political continuity of the Visigothic kingdom was broken; "Amalaric's succession was the result of new power structures, not old ones," as Heather describes it. With Amalaric's death in 531, the Visigothic kingdom entered an extended period of unrest which lasted until Leovigild assumed the throne in 568.

Ability as king 
In religion Alaric was an Arian, like all the early Visigothic nobles, but he greatly mitigated the persecution policy of his father Euric toward the Catholics and authorized them to hold in 506 the council of Agde. He was on uneasy terms with the Catholic bishops of Arelate (modern Arles) as epitomized in the career of the Gallo-Roman Caesarius, bishop of Arles, who was appointed bishop in 503. Caesarius was suspected of conspiring with the Burgundians, whose king had married the sister of Clovis, to assist the Burgundians capture Arles. Alaric exiled him for a year to Bordeaux in Aquitania, then allowed him to return unharmed when the crisis had passed.

Alaric displayed similar wisdom in political affairs by appointing a commission headed by the referendary Anianus to prepare an abstract of the Roman laws and imperial decrees, which would form the authoritative code for his Roman subjects. This is generally known as the Breviarium Alaricianum or Breviary of Alaric.

Legacy
The  (Alaric's Mountain), near Carcassonne, is named after the Visigoth king. Local rumour has it that he left a vast treasure buried in the caves beneath the mountain.

The  (Alaric's Canal) in the Hautes-Pyrénées department is named after him.

References

Further reading 
Edward Gibbon, History of the Decline and Fall of the Roman Empire Chapter 38
Alarico II , Diccionario biográfico español, Luis Agustín García Moreno, Real Academia de la Historia.

Balt dynasty
Ancient child monarchs
507 deaths
5th-century Visigothic monarchs
6th-century Visigothic monarchs
Monarchs killed in action
Year of birth unknown
Year of birth uncertain